is a Japanese actress and model from Adachi, Tokyo. She is known for the film Koizora (2007), Maria-sama ga Miteru (2010), the TV drama Asa ga Kita (2015-2016), and for co-hosting of the TBS talk show A-Studio.

Career
In 2004, at the age of 13, Haru entered the entertainment industry after being scouted by Hori Agency. She made her screen acting debut in the 2006 WOWOW television drama Taigan no Kanojo. In 2007, she debuted as an exclusive model for the fashion magazine Seventeen.

She released her first single, titled "I Miss You/Message: Asu no Boku e," on April 16, 2008. This song was used as the ending theme in the TBS variety show Kami Summers. In 2010 she appeared in a lead role for the first time in the live-action film Maria-sama ga Miteru.

A 2012 NTT DoCoMo TV commercial raised her public profile, and from 2012 to 2015 she was an exclusive model for the fashion magazine non-no. In March 2015 she was cast as lead character in the 93rd NHK Asadora Asa ga Kita.

Appearances

TV dramas
 Taigan no Kanojo (WOWOW, 2006)
 14-sai no Haha (NTV, 2006), Haru Ueda
 Watashitachi no Kyōkasho Episode 1, 9 (Fuji TV, 2007), Sakura Kumazawa
 Sumire 16 sai!! (BS Fuji, 2008), Akebi Kiryu
 Shibatora Episode 1 (Fuji TV, 2008), Rumi
 Koizora (TBS, 2008), Saki
 33-pun Tantei Episode 3 (Fuji TV, 2008)
 Room of King Episode 3 (Fuji TV, 2008), Chīko
 Ghost Town no Hana (TV Asahi, 2009), Rina Akiyama
 Gekai Hatomura Shūgorō 5 (Fuji TV, 2009), Marina Asaoka
 Orthros no Inu (TBS, 2009), Kana Shirokawa
 Shinzanmono Episode 4 (TBS, 2010), Kanae Sawamura
 Gold Episode 1-2 (Fuji TV, 2010), Ryōko Shiina
 Tōbō Bengoshi Episode 6 (KTV, 2010, Nozomi Hashimoto
 Kurohyō Ryū ga Gotoku Shinshō (MBS, 2010), Saki Kudō
 Young Black Jack (NTV, 2011)
 Tantei X Kara no Chōsenjō! Special (NHK, 2011), Mitsuko Enoki
 Switch Girl!! (Fuji TV TWO, 2011), Reika Jōgasaki
 Kazoku ga Kazoku de Aru Tameni (BS-TBS, 2012), Midori Saeki
 Ekiben Hitori Tabi: Tōhoku Hen (BS Japan, 2012), Nana Ozaki
 Legal High Episode 1 (Fuji TV, 2012), Tomoko Shimamura
 Kekkon Dōsōkai: Seaside Love (Fuji TV TWO, 2012), Renka Natsume
 Higashino Keigo Mysteries Episode 8 (Fuji TV, 2012), Yōko Saeki
 Monsters Episode 4 (TBS, 2012), Kayo Suzuki
 Pillow Talk: Bed no Shiwaku Episode 8 (KTV, 2012), Aoi
 Aibō Season 11, Episode 11 (TV Asahi, 2013), Akane Niōgō
 Shotenin Michiru no Mi no Ue Banashi (NHK, 2013), Chiaki Furukawa
 Tabemonogatari Kanojo no Kondate Chō Episode 9-10 (NHK BS Premium, 2013), Mai Yamane
 Kasukana Kanojo Episode 7 (KTV, 2013), Kasumi Hirota
 Kyūmei Byōtō 24-ji Season 5 (Fuji TV, 2013), Kaon Kunitomo
 Inemuri Sensei (TV Asahi, 2013), Masako
 Nōkon Kid: Bokura no Game Shi (TV Tokyo, 2013), Fumi Takano
 Yorozu Uranai Dokoro Onmyōya e Yōkoso Episode 3 (KTV, 2013), Natsuo Miyauchi
 Shokubutsu Danshi Berandā (NHK BS Premium, 2013)
 Kounotori no Yurikago: Akachan Post no 6-nen Kan to Sukuwareta 92 no Inochi no Mirai (TBS, 2013), Ryōko Yasuda
 Matching Love (TBS, 2013), Haruka Iwata
 Kindaichi Shōnen no Jikenbo Gokumon Juku Satsujin Jiken (NTV, 2014), Akiko Hama
 Hitojichi no Rōdokukai (WOWOW, 2014), Hitomi Hirasawa/Sakiko Hirasawa
 Border Keishichō Sōsa Ikka Satsujinhan Sōsa Dai-4 Gakari (TV Asahi, 2014), Mika Higa
 Osoroshi: Mishimaya Henchō Hyaku Monogatari (NHK BS Premium, 2014), Ochika
 Gomenne Seishun! (TBS, 2014), Yūko Hachiya
 Ubasute (Hokkaido Television Broadcasting, 2014), Diana
 Ōedo Sōsamō 2015: Onmitsu Dōshin, Aku o Kiru! (TV Tokyo, 2015), Sanae Tanuma
 Hula Girl to Inu no Choko (TV Tokyo, 2015), Kasumi Takezawa
 Asadora Asa ga Kita (NHK, 2015), Asa Shiraoka
 Sekai Ichi Muzukashii Koi (NTV, 2016), Misaki Shibayama
 On (Fuji TV, 2016), Hinako Tōdō
 Mom, May I Quit Being Your Daughter? (NHK, 2017), Mizuki Hayase
 I love You Just a Little Bit (TBS, 2017), Mitsu Watanabe
 Musume no Kekkon (TV Tokyo, 2018), Miki Kunieda
 The Kitazawas: We Mind Our Own Business (Nippon TV, 2018), Chiaki Kitazawa
 Mikaiketsu no Onna: Keishichou Bunsho Sousakan (TV Asahi, 2018), Tomo Yashiro
 Ru: Taiwan Express (NHK, 2020), Haruka
 Remolove (NTV, 2020), Mimi

Films
 Dakara Watashi o Suwarasete. Tūkin Densha de Suwaru Gijutsu! (2006), Ai
 The Graduates (2007), Kaoru Yoshii
 Koizora (2007), Aya
 Koi no Pororon (2007), Kaho
 Chī-chan wa Yūkyū no Mukou (2008), Yūko Hayashida
 Yūbae Shōjo "Asakusa no Shimai" (2008)
 Real Onigokko (2008), Haru Satō
 Rock'n Roll Diet! (2008), Narumi Eguchi
 Tenshi no Ita Okujō (2008), Mizuki Kawashiro
 Ikemen Bank The Movie (2009), Yuri Yamamura
 Guardian Angel (2009), Asami Watanabe
 Yamagata Scream (2009), Munae Haraizen
 Onna no Ko Monogatari (2009), Kimiko(Highschool Girl)
 Bushido Sixteen (2010), Midoriko Nishiogi
 Soft Boy (2010), Kusanagi
 Maria-sama ga Miteru (2010), Sachiko Ogasawara
 Afro Tanaka (2012), Mina
 Girls For Keeps (2012), Yūko Kitamura
 Good Coming: Tōru to Neko, Tama ni Neko (2012), Miyuki
 Bungo: Sasayaka na Yokubō Kokuhaku Suru Shinshitachi "Kōfuku no Kanata" (2012), Kinuko
 Party wa Sentō Kara Hajimaru (2012)
 Minasan, Sayōnara (2013), Yuri Matsushima
 Zekkyō Gakkyū (2013), Makoto Hosaka
 Crying 100 Times: Every Raindrop Falls (2013), Keiko Ogawa
 Kiyoku Yawaku (2013), Asami Kawaguchi
 Shin Ōkubo Monogatari (2013)
 Gajimaru Shokudō no Koi (2014), Mizuho Hirara
 Again (2015), Mie Tozawa
 Grasshopper (2015), Yuriko
 Before a Falling Star Fades Away (2015), Naoko Motoyama
 Oz Land (2018)
 Cafe Funiculi Funicula (2018)
 Dragon Quest: Your Story (2019), Flora (voice)
 All About March (2020), Yayoi Yūki
 Hotel Royal (2020), Masayo Tanaka
 Analog (2023), Miyuki

Video games
Nioh 2 (2020), Mumyo

Dubbing 
 Godzilla (2014), Elle Brody (Elizabeth Olsen)

Music videos
 Funky Monkey Babys - Kokuhaku (23 July 2008)
 Plus - Yukimichi (16 December 2009)
 Jang Keun-suk - Stay (30 May 2012)
 Indigo la End - Hitomi ni Utsuranai (24 September 2014)
 Dreams Come True - KNOCKKNOCK

Bibliography

Magazines
 Seventeen, Shueisha 1967-, as an exclusive model from 2007 to 2012
 Non-no, Shueisha 1971-, as an exclusive model from 2012 to 2015

Discography

Singles
 "I Miss You/Message: Asu no Boku e" (16 April 2008), ASIN B0014466SQ

Accolades

References

External links
 Official blog 
 Official agency profile 
 

1991 births
Living people
Actresses from Tokyo
Japanese female models
Japanese women singers
Japanese film actresses
Japanese television actresses
Japanese television personalities
Asadora lead actors
People from Adachi, Tokyo
21st-century Japanese actresses